David Edward Archer (born September 15, 1960) is a computational ocean chemist, and has been a professor at the Geophysical Sciences department at the University of Chicago since 1993. He has published research on the carbon cycle of the ocean and the sea floor. Archer is a contributor to the RealClimate blog.

Teaching responsibilities
He teaches classes on global warming, environmental chemistry, and global geochemical cycles. He is the author of Global Warming: Understanding the Forecast, an introductory textbook on the environmental sciences for non-science undergraduates.

Education

He obtained his Ph.D from the University of Washington in 1990.

Books
The Global Carbon Cycle (Princeton Primers in Climate), The Global Carbon Cycle (Princeton Primers in Climate)
The Warming Papers: The Scientific Foundation for the Climate Change Forecast, 2010, edited with Raymond Pierrehumbert, 432 pages
The Long Thaw: How Humans Are Changing the Next 100,000 Years of Earth's Climate, 2008, 192 pages
The Climate Crisis: An Introductory Guide to Climate Change, 2010, 260 pages
Global Warming: Understanding the Forecast, 2006, 208 pages

References

External links 

 David Archer at the University of Chicago
 David Archer at Realclimate
 David Archer at Google Scholar

1960 births
Living people
21st-century American chemists
American climatologists
Intergovernmental Panel on Climate Change contributing authors
University of Washington alumni
Environmental bloggers
Computational chemists